The 2009 European Parliament election took place on 6–7 June 2009.

The People of Freedom (33.9%) was the largest party in Lombardy, ahead of Lega Nord (22.7%) and the Democratic Party (21.3%).

Results
Source: Ministry of the Interior

2009 elections in Italy 
Elections in Lombardy
European Parliament elections in Italy
2009 European Parliament election